Bomilcar ("Servant of Melqart" or "In Melqart's Hand") may refer to:

 Bomilcar (4th century BC), Carthaginian commander in the war against Agathocles
 Bomilcar (suffete) (3rd century BC), Carthaginian suffete and commander in the Second Punic War, father of Hanno
 Bomilcar (3rd century BC), Carthaginian commander in the Second Punic War, supply officer of Hannibal
 Bomilcar (2nd century BC), Numidian nobleman and follower of Jugurtha